Being Ridden is an album by Cex. It is his second album to move away from a straight ahead electronic music sounds and indulge in a more hip-hop based music, complete with rapping by Cex. The album cover is a parody of David Bowie's album cover for his album "Heroes".

The main difference between Being Ridden and BR Instrumentals, except for the duct tape covering Kidwell's mouth, is the track listing. Every track from Being Ridden is featured on BR Instrumentals except Stamina, Other Countries and Nevermind.  These tracks only appear on Being Ridden and are replaced by My Hands Switched With Mannequin Hands, Bad Girls and M Ren Dvine. The three songs are the seventh, tenth and thirteenth tracks on both albums.

Track listing
 "The Wayback Machine" (Kidwell) – 3:36
 "You Kiss Like You're Dead" (Kidwell) – 2:19
 "Not Working" (Kidwell) – 4:22
 "Signal Katied" (Kidwell) – 1:49
 "Earth-Shaking Event" (Kidwell) – 3:20
 "Cex at Arm's Length" (Kidwell) – 2:37
 "Stamina" (Kidwell, Venetian Snares) – 2:33
 "See Ya Never, Sike" (Kidwell) – 2:25
 "The Marriage" (Kidwell) – 3:11
 "Other Countries" (Kidwell) – 3:20
 "Brer Rjyan" (Kidwell) – 3:31
 "Dead Bodies" (Kidwell) – 5:21
 "Never Mind" (Kidwell) – 1:55

External links
 Being Ridden at Temporary Residence Records

2003 albums
Cex (musician) albums